The 1969 Gillette Cup was the seventh Gillette Cup, an English limited overs county cricket tournament. It was held between 10 May and 6 September 1969. The tournament was won by Yorkshire County Cricket Club who defeated Derbyshire County Cricket Club by 69 runs in the final at Lord's.

Format
The seventeen first-class counties were joined by five Minor Counties: Buckinghamshire, Devon, Hertfordshire, Norfolk and Wiltshire. Teams who won in the first round progressed to the second round. The winners in the second round then progressed to the quarter-final stage. Winners from the quarter-finals then progressed to the semi-finals from which the winners then went on to the final at Lord's which was held on 6 September 1969.

First round

Second round

Quarter-finals

Semi-finals

Final

References

External links
CricketArchive tournament page 

Friends Provident Trophy seasons
Gillette Cup, 1969